Derik  or Derick Baegert (ca. 1440 - after 1515) was a German late Gothic painter.

Derick Baegert was probably born in Wesel around 1435-1440 to Johan Baegert, a merchant, and Mechtelt Mynreman. While his family wasn't very wealthy, Derick ended his life as one of the richer people of Wesel, living in a grand house on the Brückstrasse in the old town of Wesel. Painter Jan Baegert, in earlier literature named the Master of Cappenberg, was his son, and Jan Joest, who may have been his nephew, and the Master of the Schermbecker Altar were probably some of his pupils.

Apart from some works for the city and churches of Wesel (including the retable for the Mathenachurch, largely destroyed in the Second World War), he also painted large altar pieces for churches like the Propsteichurch in Dortmund, and works for private devotion.

Gallery

Notes

15th-century births
16th-century deaths
People from Wesel
15th-century German painters
German male painters
Gothic painters